Ralph Duff (20 May 1908 – 23 March 1951) was an  Australian rules footballer who played with Hawthorn in the Victorian Football League (VFL).

Notes

External links 

1908 births
1951 deaths
Australian rules footballers from Victoria (Australia)
Hawthorn Football Club players
Ballarat Football Club players